Roma Democratic Social Party (Romská demokratická sociální strana, RDSS) is a small Czech political party founded on 22 March 2005 and led by Miroslav Tancoš. It seeks to improve the social and economic condition of the Romani.

Clan conflict, July 2005

The party was founded by head of Tancoš clan from town Nový Brod (in Česká Lípa District). At the end of July 2005 the Tancoš clan got into conflict with Gorol clan from the same town. Gorol's have their own party: Česko-romské občanské sdružení (Czech-Roma Civic Movement). Members of the clans threatened each other with liquidation and publicly displayed firearms and machetes. Reference in Czech.

Political parties of minorities in the Czech Republic
Romani in the Czech Republic
Romani political parties
Political parties established in 2005